This was the first edition of the event.

Henrik Sundström won the tournament, beating Francisco Maciel in the final, 6–0, 7–5.

Seeds

  Diego Pérez (first round)
  Libor Pimek (second round)
  Francisco Maciel (final)
  Pablo Arraya (semifinals)
  Fernando Luna (quarterfinals)
  Bruno Orešar (quarterfinals)
  Michael Westphal (first round)
  Florin Segărceanu (first round)

Draw

Finals

Top half

Bottom half

External links
 Main draw

ATP Athens Open
1986 Grand Prix (tennis)